Sarcheshmeh Zaruni (also Romanized as Sarcheshmeh Ẕarūnī) is a village in Kuhdasht-e Jonubi Rural District, in the Central District of Kuhdasht County, Lorestan Province, Iran. At the 2006 census, its population was 255, in 63 families.

References 

Towns and villages in Kuhdasht County